Chrysler produces a number of automobile transmissions in-house.

Semi-automatic
 1941–1942 M4 Vacamatic — 4-speed (2-range manual control with automatic 2-speed shift vacuum operated) with clutch and fluid coupling (Fluid Drive); also known as Simplimatic, Powermatic
 1946–1953 M5/M6 Presto-Matic — 4-speed (2 gear manual with electric overdrive) with clutch and fluid coupling (Fluid Drive) or torque converter (Fluid Torque Drive); also known as Tip-Toe Shift, Gyro-Matic, Fluid-Matic, Gyro-Torque
 1953–1954 Hy-Drive — 3-speed manual transmission behind a torque converter

Automatic
 1954–1961 PowerFlite — 2-speed automatic
 1956–2007 TorqueFlite
 1956–1961 A466 — 3-speed automatic
 1962–1994 A727 (36RH/37RH) — 3-speed automatic
 1960–2002 A904 (30RH) — 3-speed automatic
 A998 (31RH) — 3-speed automatic
 A999 (32RH) — 3-speed automatic
 1988–2004 A500 (40RH/42RH/40RE/42RE/44RE) — 4-speed automatic
 1992–2003 A518 (46RH/46RE) — 4-speed automatic
 1994–2003 A618 (47RH/47RE) — 4-speed heavy-duty automatic
 2003–2007 A818 (48RE) — 4-speed heavy-duty automatic
 1978–1983 A404 — 3-speed front-wheel drive transaxle
 1981–2001 A413 (31TH)
 1981–1987 A470
 1987–2000 A670
 1989–present Ultradrive
 1989–2010 A604 (40TE/41TE) — 4-speed transverse front-wheel drive automatic
 1991–2004 A604 (41AE) — 4-speed transverse all-wheel drive automatic
 1993–2004 A606 (42LE) — 4-speed longitudinal front-wheel drive automatic
 2003–2012 42RLE — 4-speed longitudinal rear-wheel drive automatic
 2007–present 40TES/41TES — 4-speed transverse front-wheel drive automatic
 2007–present 62TE — 6-speed transverse front-wheel drive automatic
 2007–present 62TEA — 6-speed transverse all-wheel drive automatic
 1999–present RFE — longitudinal rear-wheel drive
 1999–2003 45RFE — 4-speed (5 gear) automatic
 2001–2011 545RFE — 5-speed (6 gear) automatic
 2012–2017 65RFE — 6-speed automatic
 2012–present 66RFE — 6-speed heavy-duty automatic
 2007–present 68RFE — 6-speed heavy-duty automatic
 2005-2019 Chrysler A580 / W5A580, 5-speed automatic.  This was a Chrysler adaptation of the Mercedes (known as 722.6) 5G-Tronic assembly, which was first labelled as the NAG1. Commonly found in the 300, Magnum, Charger, Challenger, Wrangler, and some Dodge Ram pickups, the A580 was last used in the 2020 Dodge Charger Pursuit models.

Model number conventions
Newer Chrysler automatic transmissions follow standard model number conventions.  Below are the available values and some example transmission models:

Manual
 1960–1972 Chrysler A903 — 3-speed manual for 6-cyl and low power V8s. 1st gear, no synchromesh
 1961–1971 Chrysler A745 — 3-speed manual for V8s
 1964–1974 Chrysler A833 — 4-speed manual manufactured by New Process Gear
 1970–1981 Chrysler A230 — 3-speed manual, all-synchromesh
 1973–1974 Chrysler A250 — 3-speed manual, 1st gear no synchromesh
 1975–1978 Chrysler A390 — 3-speed manual, all-synchromesh
 1976–1980 Chrysler A833 — 4-speed manual overdrive (NPG) 
 1981–1986 Chrysler A460 — 4-speed manual transaxle
 1983–1984 Chrysler A465 — 5-speed manual transaxle
 1984–1990 Chrysler A525 — 5-speed manual transaxle
 1987–1989 Chrysler A520 — 5-speed manual transaxle
 1987–1989 Chrysler A555 — 5-speed manual transaxle, Chrysler-built (NPG) with Getrag-sourced gearset
 1990–1994 Chrysler A523 — 5-speed manual transaxle
 1990–1994 Chrysler A543 — 5-speed manual transaxle
 1990–1993 Chrysler A568 — 5-speed manual transaxle, Chrysler-built (NPG) with Getrag-sourced gearset
 1995–2005 New Venture Gear T350 (also known as A578 and F5MC1) — 5-speed manual transaxle for the Dodge and Plymouth Neon and various GM subcompacts
 2001–2007 New Venture Gear T850 — 5-speed manual transaxle
 2005–present Chrysler NSG370 transmission — 6-speed longitudinal manual
 1962–1993 New Process Gear NP435 — 4-speed longitudinal manual
 1987–1991 New Process Gear NP535 (also known as New Venture Gear NV2500) — 5-speed longitudinal manual
 New Venture Gear NV1500 — 5-speed longitudinal manual
 1994–2004 New Venture Gear NV3500 — 5-speed longitudinal manual
 2000–2004 New Venture Gear NV3550
 1992–2005 New Venture Gear NV4500 — 5-speed longitudinal manual
 1999–2005 New Venture Gear NV5600 — 6-speed longitudinal manual

Non-Chrysler Transmissions used on Chrysler vehicles

Automatic

 Aisin-Warner AW4 — 4-speed longitudinal
1987–2001 Jeep Cherokee
1987–1992 Jeep Comanche
1993 Jeep Grand Cherokee (with 6-cylinder engine)
 Aisin AS66RC — 6-speed longitudinal with PTO capability
2014–present Ram Chassis Cab 3500/4500/5500 (6.4L V8)
 Aisin AS68RC — 6-speed longitudinal with PTO capability
2007–2012 Dodge Ram Chassis Cab 3500/4500/5500
 Aisin AS69RC — 6-speed longitudinal with PTO capability
2013–present Ram Chassis Cab 3500/4500/5500 (6.7L diesel)
 Aisin AW6F25 (AW60T) — 6-speed transaxle
2017–present Jeep Compass
  
Powertech 6F24 — 6-speed transverse front-wheel drive
2012–2016 Dodge Dart
2014–2016 Jeep Compass
2014–2017 Jeep Patriot
ZF 8HP (also branded as TorqueFlite 8 by Chrysler) — 8-speed longitudinal
8HP45 (replaced by 845RE)
2011–2013 Chrysler 300 V6 
2011–2013 Dodge Charger (LD) V6 Retail
2013 Ram 1500 (3.6L V6)
 845RE (Chrysler-built version of 8HP45)
2013–present Chrysler 300 V6 
2013–present Dodge Charger (LD) V6 Retail 
2014–present Dodge Durango V6
2015–present Dodge Challenger V6
2014–present Ram 1500 (3.6L V6)
2014–2016 Jeep Grand Cherokee (WK2) (3.6L V6)
 850RE (Chrysler-built version of 8HP50)
2017–present Jeep Grand Cherokee (WK2) (3.6L V6)
2018–present Jeep Wrangler (JL)
2021-present Dodge Charger V6 AWD Pursuit (LD)
8HP70
2013–present Ram 1500 (5.7L V8, 3.0L V6 diesel)
2014–present Dodge Durango V8 Retail
2015–present Dodge Charger (5.7L & 6.4L V8)
2021-present Dodge Charger Pursuit RWD V8 (LD)
2015–present Dodge Challenger (5.7L & 6.4L V8)
2014–present Jeep Grand Cherokee (WK2) (5.7L & 6.4L V8, 3.0L V6 diesel)
2015–present Chrysler 300 V8
8HP90
2015–present Dodge Challenger (6.2L V8 s/c)
2015–present Dodge Charger (LD) (6.2L V8 s/c)
8HP95
2018–present Jeep Grand Cherokee (WK2) (6.2L V8 Supercharged)
2021-present Ram 1500 TRX (6.2L V8 Supercharged)

ZF 9HP — 9-speed transverse
9HP48
2015–2017 Chrysler 200 (3.6L V6)
2017–present Jeep Compass
 948TE (Chrysler-built version of 9HP48)
2014–present Jeep Cherokee (KL)
2014–present Jeep Renegade
2015–2017 Chrysler 200 (2.4L)
2015–present Ram ProMaster City
2017–present Chrysler Pacifica

Manual

 Aisin AX5 — 5-speed longitudinal
1984–2000 Jeep Cherokee
1986–1992 Jeep Comanche
1987–2002 Jeep Wrangler
 Aisin AX15 — 5-speed longitudinal
1989–1999 Jeep Cherokee
1989–1992 Jeep Comanche
1993 Jeep Grand Cherokee
1989–1999 Jeep Wrangler
 Aisin BG6 — 6-speed transaxle
2007–2010 Chrysler Sebring (diesel engine)
2006–2011 Dodge Caliber (diesel engine)
2007–2010 Dodge Avenger (diesel engine)
2008–2010 Dodge Journey (diesel engine)
2006–2016 Jeep Compass (diesel engine)
2006–2017 Jeep Patriot (diesel engine)
 Aisin AL6 (D478) — 6-speed longitudinal
2018–present Jeep Wrangler (JL)
 Borg-Warner T-10 — 4-speed longitudinal
1963 Dodge and Plymouth V8, except Hemi
 Borg-Warner T-56 (also known as Tremec T-56) — 6-speed longitudinal
2004–2006 Dodge Ram SRT10
1992–2002 Dodge Viper RT/10
1996–2002 Dodge Viper GTS
2003–2007 Dodge Viper SRT-10
 Fiat C510 — 5-speed transaxle
2014–present Jeep Renegade (1.6L E.torQ)
 Fiat C635 — 6-speed transaxle
2011–present Dodge Journey/Fiat Freemont  (2.0L MultiJet)
2012–2016 Dodge Dart (1.4L turbo)
2014–present Jeep Renegade (1.4L turbo, 1.6L-2.0L MultiJet)
2017–present Jeep Compass
Getrag 360 5 speed longitudinal 1989-1993 w/d 250 250 cummins diesel
 Getrag 238 — 6-speed longitudinal
2005–2008 Dodge Ram
2005–2009 Dodge Dakota
 Getrag 288 — 5-speed transaxle
2003–2008 Chrysler PT Cruiser GT
 Getrag DMT6 — 6-speed transaxle
2008–2009 Dodge Caliber SRT4
 Magna Driveline T355 — 5-speed transaxle
2006–2011 Dodge Caliber
2008–2010 Dodge Journey
2006–2016 Jeep Compass
2006–2017 Jeep Patriot
 Mercedes-Benz G56 — 6-speed longitudinal
2005–present Dodge Ram 2500/3500/4500/5500
 Mitsubishi F5 — 5-speed transaxle
F5M22
1989–1994 Plymouth Laser (1.8L - 2.0L n/a)
F5M33
1991–1996 Dodge Stealth (3.0L V6 n/a)
1989–1994 Plymouth Laser (2.0L turbo)
F5M42
2000–2006 Dodge Stratus (2.4L - 2.7L)
F5M51
2000–2006 Chrysler Sebring (3.0L V6)
2001–2006 Dodge Stratus (3.0L V6)
 Peugeot BA10/5 - 5-speed longitudinal
1987-mid-1989 YJ Wrangler, XJ Cherokee and MJ Commanche
 Tremec TR-6060 — 6-speed longitudinal
2008–2010 Dodge Viper SRT-10
2009–present Dodge Challenger
2012–present SRT and Dodge Viper
 Volkswagen 020 — 4-speed transaxle adopted as Chrysler A412
1978–1982 Dodge Omni 1.7L
1978–1982 Plymouth Horizon 1.7L

Dual clutch
 Fiat C635 DDCT
2012–2016 Dodge Dart (1.4L turbo)
2014–present Jeep Renegade
 Fiat C725 DDCT
2016–present Jeep Renegade (China)
2017–present Jeep Compass (China)
 Getrag MPS6 (6DCT450)
2009–2010 Chrysler Sebring (diesel engine)
2009–2010 Dodge Avenger (diesel engine)
2009–2010 Dodge Journey (diesel engine)

Continuously variable
 Jatco JF011E
 2007-2012 Dodge Caliber
 2006–2016 Jeep Compass
 2006–2017 Jeep Patriot

See also
 List of AMC Transmission Applications (for list of transmission used in AMC vehicles before Chrysler buyout)

References

Chrysler transmissions
Lists of automobile transmissions